The 2008 Pacific Rim Championships were held in San Jose, California, from March 28–30. Four disciplines of gymnastics were contested: women's artistic, men's artistic, rhythmic, and trampolining.

Medal winners

Men

Women

Detail results

Team

Seniors

All-Around

Vault

Uneven Bars

Balance Beam

Floor Exercise

Juniors

All-Around

Vault

Uneven Bars

Balance Beam

Floor Exercise

References

2008
Pacific Rim Gymnastics Championships
Sports in San Jose, California
Pacific Rim Gymnastics Championships
International gymnastics competitions hosted by the United States
2008 in American sports